A nationally determined contribution (NDC) or intended nationally determined contribution (INDC) is a non-binding national plan highlighting climate change mitigation, including climate-related targets for greenhouse gas emission reductions. These plans also include policies and measures governments aim to implement in response to climate change and as a contribution to achieve the global targets set out in the Paris Agreement.

NDCs are the first greenhouse gas targets under the UNFCCC that apply equally to both developed and developing countries.

Process

The establishment of NDCs combine the top-down system of a traditional international agreement with bottom-up system-in elements through which countries put forward their own goals and policies in the context of their own national circumstances, capabilities, and priorities, with the goal of reducing global greenhouse gas emissions enough limit anthropogenic temperature rise to well below 2 °C (3.6 °F) above pre-industrial levels; and to pursue efforts to limit the increase to 1.5 °C (2.7 °F).).

NDCs contain steps taken towards emissions reductions and also aim to address steps taken to adapt to climate change impacts, and what support the country needs, or will provide, to address climate change. After the initial submission of INDCs in March 2015, an assessment phase followed to review the impact of the submitted INDCs before the 2015 United Nations Climate Change Conference.

NDCs are established independently by the parties (countries or regional groups of countries) in question. However, they are set within a binding iterative "catalytic" framework designed to ratchet up climate action over time. Once states have set their initial NDCs, these are expected to be updated on a 5-year cycle. Biennial progress reports are to be published that track progress toward the objectives set out in states' NDCs. These will be subjected to technical review, and will collectively feed into a global stocktaking exercise, itself operating on an offset 5-year cycle, where the overall sufficiency of NDCs collectively will be assessed.

The information gathered from parties' individual reports and reviews, along with the more comprehensive picture attained through the "global stocktake" will, in turn, feed back into and shape the formulation of states' subsequent pledges. The logic, overall, is that this process will offer numerous avenues where domestic and transnational political processes can play out, facilitating the making of more ambitious commitments and putting pressure on states to comply with their nationally determined goals.

All the goals for each country are stated in their NDC which are based on the points below.
 Climate neutral to 2050
 Limiting global warming to well below 2 °C and pursuing efforts to limit it to 1.5 °C
 Reduction in emissions of greenhouse gases (GHG)
 Increase adaptation to the harmful effects of climate change
 Adjust financial flows so they can be combined with reduced GHG emissions

Global goals 
The Sustainable Development Goal 13 on climate action has an indicator related to NDCs for its second target: Indicator 13.2.1 is the "Number of countries with nationally determined contributions, long-term strategies, national adaptation plans, strategies as reported in adaptation communications and national communications". As of 31 March 2020, 186 parties (185 countries plus the European Union) had communicated their first NDCs to the United Nations Framework Convention on Climate Change Secretariat. A report by the UN stated in 2020 that: "the world is way off track in meeting this target at the current level of nationally determined contributions."

The COVID-19 pandemic is thought to offer an opportunity for countries to "reassess priorities and to rebuild their economies to be greener and more resilient to climate change".

History
NDCs have an antecedent in the pledge and review system that had been considered by international climage negotiators back in the early 1990s.
All countries that were parties to the United Nations Framework Convention on Climate Change (UNFCCC) were asked to publish their intended nationally determined contributions at the 2013 United Nations Climate Change Conference held in Warsaw, Poland, in November 2013. The intended contributions were determined without prejudice to the legal nature of the contributions. The term was intended as a compromise between "quantified emissions limitation and reduction objective" (QELROs) and "Nationally Appropriate Mitigation Actions" (NAMAs) that the Kyoto Protocol used to describe the different legal obligations of developed and developing countries.

After the Paris Agreement entered into force in 2016, the INDCs became the first NDC when a country ratified the agreement unless it decided to submit a new NDC at the same time. NDCs are the first greenhouse gas targets under the UNFCCC that apply equally to both developed and developing countries.

INDC Submissions
On 27 February 2015, Switzerland became the first nation to submit its INDC. Switzerland said that it had experienced a temperature rise of 1.75 °C since 1864, and aimed to reduce greenhouse gas emissions 50% by 2030.

India submitted its INDC to the UNFCCC in October 2015, committing to cut the emissions intensity of GDP by 33–35% by 2030 from 2005 levels.  On its submission, India wrote that it needs "at least USD 2.5 trillion" to achieve its 2015–2030 goals, and that its "international climate finance needs" will be the difference over "what can be made available from domestic sources."

Of surveyed countries, 85% reported that they were challenged by the short time frame available to develop INDCs. Other challenges reported include difficulty to secure high-level political support, a lack of certainty and guidance on what should be included in INDCs, and limited expertise for the assessment of technical options. However, despite challenges, less than a quarter of countries said they had received international support to prepare their INDCs, and more than a quarter indicated they are still applying for international support. The INDC process and the challenges it presents are unique to each country and there is no "one-size-fits-all" approach or methodology.

Results and current status

Emission reductions offered of current NDCs 

Through the Climate Change Performance Index, Climate Action Tracker and the Climate Clock, people can see on-line how well each individual country is currently on track to achieving its Paris agreement commitments. These tools however only give a general insight in regards to the current collective and individual country emission reductions. They do not give insight in regards on the emission reductions offered per country, for each measure proposed in the NDC.

Achievement status and sufficiency for Paris Agreement warming thresholds 
The rates of emissions reductions need to increase by 80% beyond NDCs to likely meet the 2°C upper target range of the Paris Agreement. The probabilities of major emitters meeting their NDCs without such an increase is very low. Therefore, with current trends the probability of staying below 2 °C of warming is only 5% – and if NDCs were met and continued post-2030 by all signatory systems the probability would be 26%. Experts have recommended fundamental structural changes of the socioeconomics of global civilization for a systematic "decarbonization" and related mechanisms – such as of work, accountability and resource-allocation – as well as pursuing a path for a maximum of 1.5 degrees of warming, rather than 2 degrees.

By country

References

External links 
 Registry with admitted NDC's by country
 
 

2015 in the environment
United Nations Framework Convention on Climate Change
Greenhouse gas inventories